Breakthrough is an album by the Don Pullen-George Adams Quartet recorded in 1986 for the Blue Note label.

Reception
The AllMusic review by Richard S. Ginell stated: "Throughout the record, the band's creativity burns at white heat, making this disc a good first choice for newcomers to Pullen".

Track listing
All compositions by Don Pullen except as indicated
 "Mr. Smoothie" (George Adams) - 6:07
 "Just Foolin' Around" - 6:20
 "Song From the Old Country" - 8:13  
 "We've Been Here All the Time" - 9:09
 "A Time for Sobriety" (Adams) - 9:43
 "The Necessary Blues (or: Thank You Very Much Mr Monk)" - 13:35 Bonus track on CD only
Recorded at RCA Studio A in New York City on April 30, 1986

Personnel
Don Pullen – piano
George Adams – tenor saxophone
Cameron Brown – bass
Dannie Richmond – drums

References

Blue Note Records albums
Don Pullen albums
George Adams (musician) albums
1986 albums
Collaborative albums